was a Sengoku period Japanese castle located in what is now Shinshiro, eastern Aichi Prefecture, Japan. It is noteworthy as the site of the crucial Battle of Nagashino between the combined forces of Tokugawa Ieyasu and Oda Nobunaga against Takeda Katsuyori in 1575. The ruins have been protected  as a National Historic Site since 1929, the first time a former castle site had received such protection.

Background
Nagashino Castle is placed on a cliff overlooking the confluence of the Kansagawa River (Toyokawa River) and the Uregawa River, in the northeastern portion of what is now the city of Shinshiro. All that remains of the castle today are remnants of moats and some stonework. This location commanded the crossing of the road connecting eastern Mikawa Province with southern Shinano Province and the  road connecting Tōtōmi Province with eastern Mino Province.

History 
In the Muromachi period, this area of Mikawa Province was controlled by small, petty warlords, which included the Okudaira clan and the Suganuma clan. In 1508, Imagawa Ujichika, ruler of Suruga and Totomi Provinces, ordered his vassal Suganuma Motonari to build a castle at this location Shitara County, Mikawa Province to guard the western approaches to his domains. After the fall of the Imagawa clan at the Battle of Okehazama in 1560, the Suganuma pledged fealty to Tokugawa Ieyasu. However, when Takeda Shingen conquered the Ina region of Shinano Province and threatened northern Mikawa, the Suganuma defected to the Takeda clan.

After Takeda Shingen died in 1573, Tokugawa Ieyasu recovered Nagashino Castle and dispossessed the Suganuma, placing Okudaira Nobumasa as castellan instead. Okudaira Sadamasa had been a vassal of the Takeda, but had defected to the Tokugawa, resulting in the death of his wife and brother, who had been kept hostage by the Takeda to prevent just such an action. Anticipating that Takeda Katsuyori would attack at Nagashino, the Tokugawa and Okudaira strengthened the castle's defenses. The anticipated attack came in May 1575, when the Takeda attacked with an army of 15,000 man and laid siege to Nagashino. Okudaira had a force of only 500 men, and managed to send a messenger to Tokugawa Ieyasu. In the subsequent Battle of Nagashino, the combined forces of Tokugawa Ieyasu and Oda Nobunaga brought a total force of 38,000 men to relieve the siege. Seeking to protect his arquebusiers from the Takeda cavalry, Nobunaga built a number of wooden stockades, behind which his gunners attacked in volleys. By mid-afternoon on the day of the battle, the Takeda broke and fled, after losing a great number of men, including eight the famous 'Twenty-Four Generals' Katsuyori had inherited from Takeda Shingen. This use of gunfire was a turning point in the history of samurai warfare and the beginning of the end of the Takeda clan.

After the battle, the castle was allowed to fall into ruin. Okudaira Nobumasa received a large territory from Ieyasu and built Shinshiro Castle some distance away from Nagashino. Most of the site  has disappeared under modern  development; however, a huge clay wall ten meters high and wide moats which surrounded the inner bailey  still exist. There is also the  museum on site. The ruins are a 15-minute walk from JR Central Iida Line Nagashinojō Station.

In 2006, the site of Nagashino Castle was listed as No. 46 of the 100 Fine Castles of Japan by the Japan Castle Foundation.

Gallery

See also
List of Historic Sites of Japan (Aichi)

References

Further reading

External links

 Shinshiro city home page 
Aichi Culture Navi 

Castles in Aichi Prefecture
100 Fine Castles of Japan
Historic Sites of Japan
Ruined castles in Japan
History of Aichi Prefecture
1500s establishments in Japan
Shinshiro, Aichi
Mikawa Province
Okudaira clan